Despair is a 1978 film directed by Rainer Werner Fassbinder and starring Dirk Bogarde, based on the 1934 novel of the same name by Vladimir Nabokov. It was Fassbinder's first English-language film and was entered into the 1978 Cannes Film Festival.

Similarly to the novel, the tone of the film is ironic. The plot is mostly similar to the novel, although one of the key characters is significantly altered in the adaptation.

Plot
Hermann Hermann lives in Berlin during the Weimar Republic. A refugee from Soviet Russia, with a Baltic German father and a wealthy Jewish mother, he has inherited a business making chocolates. His Jewish wife Lydia, voluptuous but not intelligent, has an over-close relationship with her bachelor cousin, a painter called Ardalion. As the Great Depression bites and Nazi thugs start targeting Jewish businesses, with his firm becoming less profitable and Germany less hospitable, Hermann starts dreaming of escape. He already has moments of leaving his body, for example to watch himself making love to his wife, and consults a man he believes to be a Viennese psychiatrist. In fact it is a life insurance salesman, who sells Hermann a policy.

After watching a film which features a doppelgänger, he sees an unemployed drifter called Felix, who he decides is his double. Felix, bemused as there is no resemblance between them, goes along with the idea when Hermann promises him a job. The work, it emerges, is to act as Hermann's double for a substantial lump sum.

Hermann is now able to finalize his plan, which is to erase all traces of his unwelcome existence. After getting Ardalion to write a letter that demands money to leave Lydia and go painting in Switzerland, he shows the letter to the insurance salesman as evidence that he is being blackmailed. Then he tells Lydia that he has a troubled twin brother who is contemplating suicide. He will change clothes with his brother, so that the corpse is taken as his, and lie low in Switzerland. When Lydia has been paid the insurance money, she is to join him there.

Having lured Felix to a secluded place in the woods, Hermann dresses Felix up in his own clothes, shaves his facial hair, adjusts his hairstyle and files his nails. Hermann then shoots him dead. Dressed as Felix and with Felix's passport, he goes to a Swiss hotel, where he learns from newspapers that Berlin police are seeking the murderer and suspect it is him. Moving in increasing desperation from village to village, in the end he is spotted by Ardalion and armed police close in. He explains that he is an actor making a film and they must stand aside to let him go on.

Cast
 Dirk Bogarde – Hermann Hermann
 Andréa Ferréol – Lydia Hermann
 Klaus Löwitsch – Felix Weber
 Volker Spengler – Ardalion
 Peter Kern – Müller
 Alexander Allerson – Mayer
 Gottfried John – Perebrodov
 Hark Bohm – Doctor
 Bernhard Wicki – Orlovius
 Adrian Hoven – Inspector Schelling
 Roger Fritz – Inspector Braun
 Y Sa Lo – Elsie
 Armin Meier – 1st Twin/2nd Twin/Foreman
 Ingrid Caven – Hotel receptionist
 Voli Geiler – Madam

Production
The film was Fassbinder's first English language film and his most expensive to date, with a cost of $2.6 million, compared to his earlier films which had budgets below $300,000.

Home media
Despair was released to region 1 DVD and Blu-Ray in 2011.

References

Further reading
  A personal essay related to the author's first viewing of Despair in 1979.
 Tibbetts, John C., and James M. Welsh, eds. The Encyclopedia of Novels Into Film (2nd ed. 2005) pp 95–96.

External links

 

1978 films
1978 drama films
German drama films
West German films
Films set in Berlin
Films shot in Bavaria
Films shot in Hamburg
Films shot in Braunschweig
Films set in 1930
Films directed by Rainer Werner Fassbinder
Films based on works by Vladimir Nabokov
English-language German films
Films based on Russian novels
Films based on American novels
1970s English-language films
1970s German films